Guidonia may refer to:
Guidonia Montecelio, an Italian town
Guidonia P.Browne, a synonym of the plant genus Laetia
Guidonia (DC.) Griseb. and Guidonia Mill., both synonyms of the plant genus Samyda
Guidonia (gastropod), an extinct genus; see List of gastropods described in 2010